Deja Voodoo may refer to:

 Deja Voodoo (Canadian band), a 1980s garage band
 Deja Voodoo (New Zealand band), a rock band from Auckland
 Déjà Voodoo (Gov't Mule album), 2004
 Déjà Voodoo, an album, or the title song, by Heavy Stereo, 1996
 De-jah Voodoo, an album by Dread Zeppelin, 2000
 "Déjà Voodoo", a song by Kenny Wayne Shepherd from Ledbetter Heights
 "Deja Voodoo" (Dead Zone), a television episode

See also
 Déjà vu (disambiguation)